Zinzikon is a quarter in the district 2 of Winterthur.

It was formerly a part of Oberwinterthur municipality, which was incorporated into Winterthur in 1922.

References

Winterthur